Matthew S. Rosen is an American physicist.

After graduating from The Knox School in St. James, New York, in 1988, Rosen completed a bachelor's degree in physics at Rensselaer Polytechnic Institute, followed by a doctorate in the same subject at the University of Michigan. Rosen was elected a fellow of the American Physical Society in 2021, for his research on "medical imaging through the development and commercialization of low field human MRI scanners, for the development of automated transform by manifold approximation (AUTOMAP), a general AI-based image reconstruction framework, and for unique spin hyperpolarization techniques."  In 2021, he gave the Paul Callaghan prize lecture at ISMAR. He is a faculty member at the Athinoula A. Martinos Center for Biomedical Imaging and an Associate Professor at Harvard Medical School. He is the Kiyomi and Ed Baird MGH Research Scholar.

External links 
 Matthew Rosen's publications indexed by Google Scholar.

References

Year of birth missing (living people)
Living people
21st-century American physicists
University of Michigan alumni
Rensselaer Polytechnic Institute alumni
Massachusetts General Hospital faculty
Fellows of the American Physical Society